The 46th annual Venice International Film Festival was held from 4 to 15 September 1989.

Jury
The following people comprised the 1989 jury:
Andrei Smirnov: Head of Jury
Néstor Almendros
Pupi Avati
Klaus Maria Brandauer
Danièle Heymann
Eleni Karaindrou
Mariangela Melato
David Robinson
Jin Xie
John Landis

Official selection

In competition

Autonomous sections

Venice International Film Critics' Week
The following feature films were selected to be screened as In Competition for this section:
 Koma (en. "Coma") by Nijole Adomenajte (Soviet Union)
 Corsa di primavera (en. Spring Race) Giacomo Campiotti (Italy)
 O Sangue (en. Blood) by Pedro Costa (Portugal)
 Chameleon Street by Wendell B. Harris Jr. (United States)
 Homebound (Kotia päin) by Ilkka Järvi-Laturi (Finland)
 Jaded by Oja Kodar (United States)
 The Handsome Priest (Il prete bello) by Carlo Mazzacurati (Italy)
 Love Without Pity (Un monde sans pitié) by Éric Rochant (France)
 Lover Boy by Geoffrey Wright (Australia)

Awards

Golden Lion:
A City of Sadness by Hou Hsiao-hsien
Grand Special Jury Prize:
And Then There Was Light (Et la lumière fut) by Otar Iosseliani
Silver Lion:
Recollections of the Yellow House (Recordações da Casa Amarela) by João César Monteiro
Death of a Tea Master (Sen no Rikyu: Honkakubô ibun) by Kei Kumai
Golden Osella:
 Best Screenplay - Jules Feiffer (I Want to Go Home)
 Best Cinematography - Giorgos Arvanitis (Australia)
 Best Music - Claudio Mattone  (Scugnizzi)
Volpi Cup:
 Best Actor - Massimo Troisi & Marcello Mastroianni (What Time Is It?)
 Best Actress - Peggy Ashcroft & Geraldine James (She's Been Away)
The President of the Italian Senate's Gold Medal:
Scugnizzi by Nanni Loy
Career Golden Lion:
Robert Bresson
Golden Ciak: 
Best Film - I Want to Go Home by Alain Resnais
Best Actor - Massimo Troisi (What Time Is It?)
Best Actress - Peggy Ashcroft (She's Been Away)
FIPRESCI Prize:
Critics Week - Love Without Pity by Eric Rochant
Competition - Dekalog by Krzysztof Kieślowski
OCIC Award:
What Time Is It? by Ettore Scola
OCIC Award - Honorable Mention:
Ek Din Achanak by Mrinal Sen
UNICEF Award:
Reinhard Hauff
UNESCO Award:
Hou Hsiao-hsien (A City of Sadness)
Pasinetti Award:
Best Film - I Want to Go Home by Alain Resnais
Best Actor - Massimo Troisi (What Time Is It?)
Best Actress - Peggy Ashcroft (She's Been Away)
Pietro Bianchi Award:
Francesco Rosi
Little Golden Lion:
Scugnizzi by Nanni Loy
She's Been Away by Peter Hall
Elvira Notari Prize:
Olga Narutskaya (Muzh i doch' Tamary Aleksandrovny)
Filmcritica "Bastone Bianco" Award:
Nanni Moretti (Red Wood Pigeon)
Filmcritica "Bastone Bianco" Award - Special Mention:
Otar Iosseliani (And Then There Was Light)
Amos Gitai (Berlin-Jerusalem)
João César Monteiro (Recollections of the Yellow House)
Sergio Trasatti Award:
Peter Hall (She's Been Away)
Children and Cinema Award:
Krzysztof Kieślowski (Dekalog)
Kodak-Cinecritica Award:
Eric Rochant (Love Without Pity)

References

External links

 
 Venice Film Festival 1989 Awards on IMDb

1989 film festivals
Venice
Venice
Venice Film Festival
Film
September 1989 events in Europe